Michigan Lawyers Weekly, published in Farmington Hills, Michigan, is a statewide newspaper for the legal profession.

The paper publishes each Monday, 52 weeks a year.

History
Michigan Lawyers Weekly, founded in 1986, was first published in Lansing, Michigan by Lawyers Weekly, Inc. In December 2001, the paper relocated to Novi, Michigan.

In 2004, Minneapolis-based Dolan Media, Inc. (now BridgeTower Media) acquired the paper. Operations were moved to Farmington Hills in 2005.

Content
Michigan Lawyers Weekly reports on Michigan and federal court decisions, legal ethics and judicial conduct issues, and jury verdicts.

The paper's website compiles sources of legal news and information.

See also 

 Vince Colella

References

External links
 

Newspapers published in Michigan
Legal newspapers
Gannett publications